Cesare de Montis is an official of the European Union. He was the Head of the Delegation of the European Union to Moldova (October 2005 – November 2009).

Biography

In October 2005, Cesare de Montis became the first Head of the Delegation of the European Union to Moldova; in November 2009, he was replaced by Dirk Schuebel

Awards
The interim President of Moldova, Mihai Ghimpu, awarded the Honour Order to Cesare de Montis in October 2009 at the end of his mandate in Moldova.

References

External links 
 Dirk Schuebel
 Dirk Schuebel: Moldova's hard times give possibilities for fiscal reforms
 Dirk Schuebel recommends to improve customs services

European civil servants
Ambassadors of the European Union to Moldova
Living people
Recipients of the Order of Honour (Moldova)
Year of birth missing (living people)